Adriano Abel Sapinãla (born 26 September 1977) is an Angolan politician for UNITA and a member of the National Assembly of Angola.

He is the son of the historian José Samuel Chiwale (co-founder of UNITA) and Helena Bonguela Abel, deputy and vice-president of LIMA, the women's organization of the party.

References

Living people
Members of the National Assembly (Angola)
UNITA politicians
1977 births